Darryl "The Iceman" Pearce (born 15 October 1960) is an Australian former professional basketball player. He played in Australia's National Basketball League (NBL) for the Adelaide 36ers from 1982 to 1991 before playing four seasons (1992–1995) with the North Melbourne Giants. A 6'3" (191 cm) Shooting guard, Pearce is regarded as one of the best ever Three-point field goal shooters in NBL history having shot at 41.9% from beyond the arc during his 374-game career.

Career

Adelaide 36ers
Darryl Pearce was born in Adelaide, South Australia, and was a member of junior South Australian teams in the late 1970s and early 1980s. The Adelaide 36ers were formed for the 1982 NBL season (as the Adelaide City Eagles) with Pearce one of the first guards signed by the club. He made his NBL debut on 6 February 1982 in Adelaide's 87–84 loss to the Coburg Giants at Adelaide's Apollo Stadium. Pearce scored 14 points and collected 4 rebounds on debut for the new club. He would go on to average 15.9 points, 2.7 rebounds and 2.0 assists in his first season.

The club changed its name to the Adelaide 36ers from the 1983 NBL season, though the club failed to make the playoffs until 1984 where they were defeated in the Elimination Finals by the Nunawading Spectres. By this time "The Iceman" had cemented his place as one of the premier shooting guards in the league.

Following the 1984 season, Adelaide's "other" team, the 1982 champion West Adelaide Bearcats, pulled out of the NBL and a number of their star players including 1982 season MVP Al Green, Australian boomers representatives Peter Ali and Ray Wood, and young gun Mike McKay, moved across to play for the 36ers.

Former Australian Boomer and 1964 Olympic representative Ken Cole was signed as coach of the Adelaide 36ers for the 1985 NBL season. Under Cole, the 36ers became one of the league's premier teams. Also joining the 36ers was 6'9" (206 cm) centre Bill Jones, and 6'7" (201 cm) rebounding Power forward Mark Davis. Adelaide went on to a 20–6 record and second on the regular season ladder behind the Brisbane Bullets. The team had a bye going into the semi-final where they easily defeated for the Newcastle Falcons 151–103 at home in what is still a record semi-final win in the NBL. In the last single game NBL grand final ever played, Adelaide were up against the Brisbane Bullets on the Bullets' home court (Sleeman Sports Centre). Going into the final period the game the Bullets' were leading 78–74 but a 42–21 last period in favour of the home team saw Adelaide fail to win their first grand final going down 95–120.

Statistically Darryl Pearce enjoyed his best ever NBL season in 1985, averaging 22.8 points, 2.9 rebounds and 4.6 assists. With Green and Pearce, the 36ers had what many believed to be the league's best guard combination despite both being natural shooting guards. Cole successfully chose to leave Pearce at SG (primarily due to his better outside shooting) and move Green to play Point guard. Green jokingly later told that he "hated" Pearce for being forced to play the point, but added seriously that he would play alongside him any day because he is "a true winner".

Pearce and the 36ers won their first NBL championship in 1986, defeating the Brisbane Bullets 2–1 in the NBL's first ever three game Grand Final series. The Iceman averaged 19.3 points, 3.1 rebounds and 3.9 assists for the season while averaging 23.0 points, 4.0 rebounds and 4.0 assists in the GF series.

While Adelaide, now under the coaching of Gary Fox, was still at the top of the league in 1987 and 1988, they were unable to progress past the Semi-finals in both seasons. Pearce averaged 20.6 points in both seasons. In Round 2 of the 1988 season against the Ken Cole coached Newcastle Falcons in Newcastle, Pearce set two Adelaide 36ers records that still stand as of the 2014–15 NBL season. He set the 36ers single game scoring record with 48 points and also set the record for most three-pointers made when he hit 11/14 from outside the arc with only Brett Maher able to match his 3-point record when he hit 11/12 in a game against Brisbane in 1996.

The team slipped to 6th place in 1989 in Fox's last year as coach before missing the playoffs for the first time in seven years by finishing 9th in 1990 under new coach and long time team assistant Don Shipway. Despite Adelaide missing the playoffs in 1990, Pearce was selected to his only NBL All Star Game played at the Perth Entertainment Centre.

The club was back in the Semi-finals in 1991, but once again fell short, losing the Semis to defending champions the Perth Wildcats. 1991 would prove to be Darryl Pearce's last as a 36ers player and before the 1992 NBL season he was released by the club and would join the North Melbourne Giants.

Darryl Pearce played 258 NBL games for the Adelaide 36ers.

North Melbourne Giants
Pearce joined North Melbourne for the 1992 season, with his first game for the club being against Adelaide at the 36ers new home, the 8,000 seat Clipsal Powerhouse. He scored 8 points, 4 rebounds and 4 assists for the Giants, though they were beaten 106–84. Despite their poor start, the Giants would make the Semi-finals in 1992 where they were defeated in two games by the South East Melbourne Magic.

After being eliminated in the 1993 Quarter finals by the Perth Wildcats, the Giants bounced back in 1994 to win their second NBL championship after defeating Pearce's former club Adelaide 2–0 in the Grand Final series.

Darryl Pearce's last season in the NBL came in 1995. He announced his retirement after the Giants lost the Grand Final series to the Wildcats.

International
Darryl Pearce played numerous games for the Australian boomers throughout his career. He represented Australia in the 1986 FIBA World Championship in Spain, as well as at the 1988 Summer Olympics in Seoul, South Korea.

Accolades
Darryl Pearce was inducted into the Australian Basketball Hall of Fame in 2002.

On 14 November 2015, the Adelaide 36ers will formally retire the No. 4 worn by Darryl Pearce as well as the No. 15 of his long time guard partner Al Green. The numbers will join the No. 5 of Brett Maher and the No. 33 of their 1986 championship teammate Mark Davis hanging from the rafters of the Titanium Security Arena.

Current
As of 2016, Pearce lives in Melbourne where he works as a financial planner.

Honour roll

NBL career stats

|-
| style="text-align:left"| 1982
| style="text-align:left;"| Adelaide City Eagles
| 26 || 26 || NA || .514 || NA || .761 || 2.7 || 2.0 || NA || NA || 15.6
|-
| style="text-align:left"| 1983
| style="text-align:left;"| Adelaide 36ers
| 22 || 22 || NA || .516 || NA || .750 || 1.7 || 2.1 || 1.0 || 0.0 || 15.8
|-
| style="text-align:left"| 1984
| style="text-align:left;"| Adelaide 36ers
| 24 || 24 || NA || .469 || .440 || .809 || 3.1 || 3.5 || 0.8 || 0.4 || 26.0
|-
| style="text-align:left"| 1985
| style="text-align:left;"| Adelaide 36ers
| 28 || 28 || NA || .443 || .454 || .761 || 2.9 || 4.6 || 1.2 || 0.5 || 22.8
|-
| style="text-align:left; background:#afe6ba;"| 1986†
| style="text-align:left;"| Adelaide 36ers
| 29 || 29 || NA || .410 || .388 || .828 || 3.1 || 3.9 || 1.0 || 0.2 || 19.3
|-
| style="text-align:left"| 1987
| style="text-align:left;"| Adelaide 36ers
| 21 || 21 || 33.3 || .485 || .444 || .757 || 2.1 || 2.4 || 0.9 || 0.5 || 20.6
|-
| style="text-align:left"| 1988
| style="text-align:left;"| Adelaide 36ers
| 26 || 26 || 37.4 || .457 || .411 || .833 || 2.5 || 4.9 || 1.1 || 0.2 || 20.6
|-
| style="text-align:left"| 1989
| style="text-align:left;"| Adelaide 36ers
| 27 || 27 || 35.8 || .409 || .344 || .893 || 2.5 || 4.2 || 1.2 || 0.2 || 15.2
|-
| style="text-align:left"| 1990
| style="text-align:left;"| Adelaide 36ers
| 26 || 26 || 33.9 || .434 || .447 || .841 || 2.5 || 5.4 || 1.2 || 0.5 || 16.9
|-
| style="text-align:left"| 1991
| style="text-align:left;"| Adelaide 36ers
| 29 || 29 || 24.8 || .455 || .446 || .836 || 1.5 || 2.8 || 0.8 || 0.1 || 16.0
|-
| style="text-align:left"| 1992
| style="text-align:left;"| North Melbourne Giants
| 28 || NA || 20.3 || .437 || .366 || .852 || 1.3 || 1.3 || 0.9 || 0.0 || 8.6
|-
| style="text-align:left"| 1993
| style="text-align:left;"| North Melbourne Giants
| 29 || NA || 30.6 || .412 || .402 || .655 || 2.1 || 3.7 || 1.2 || 0.3 || 11.6
|-
| style="text-align:left; background:#afe6ba;"| 1994†
| style="text-align:left;"| North Melbourne Giants
| 30 || NA || 15.4 || .464 || .441 || .692 || 1.3 || 1.5 || 0.7 || 0.0 || 8.0
|-
| style="text-align:left"| 1995
| style="text-align:left;"| North Melbourne Giants
| 29 || NA || 12.3 || .435 || .433 || .667 || 0.8 || 1.2 || 0.6 || 0.2 || 5.7
|- class="sortbottom"
| style="text-align:center;" colspan="2" | Career
| 374 || NA || NA || .453 || .419 || .797 || 2.1 || 3.2 || 0.9 || 0.2 || 15.6
|}

References

1960 births
Living people
Adelaide 36ers players
Australian men's basketball players
Basketball players at the 1988 Summer Olympics
North Melbourne Giants players
Olympic basketball players of Australia
Shooting guards
Basketball players from Adelaide
1986 FIBA World Championship players